Dr. Kate Shaw (born 1961, in Melbourne, Australia) is an Australian academic, planning activist and commentator, currently serving as a research fellow at the University of Melbourne.

Background
Kate Shaw worked in alternative theatre and arts publicity in Melbourne in the 1980s, before undertaking a post-Graduate Diploma in urban policy and planning (1993) and a Masters in urban planning (1999), both at RMIT. She then moved to the University of Melbourne and taught planning law, statutory planning, urban design, and ran classes on political economy, gentrification and the cultures of cities.

Professor Shaw's PhD in planning (University of Melbourne, 2005) was "Room to move: the politics of protecting the place of alternative culture" and used a number of case studies from European and Australian cities to investigate the range of policies that have been used to support alternative culture in neighbourhoods subject to gentrification.

From 2005 to 2008 she was research associate on a large project with Prof. Ruth Fincher titled "Transnational and Temporary: students, community and place-making in central Melbourne", looking at the growing student population and how they are housed in Melbourne. Her own ARC funded project on "Planning the ‘creative city’: reconciling global strategies with local subcultures" took place from 2009 to 2012.

Scholarly contributions
Her current research focuses on urban renewal in the 21st century. Accepting that the economic case for growth combines with the environmental case for limiting urban sprawl to produce an irresistible logic for increasing the densities of Australian cities, it explores ways of improving on the renewal projects of the last 50 years. Current work examines the legislative, regulatory, financial, political and cultural barriers to socially equitable urban development, and researches practices across the world that do it well.

Her most recent book is Whose Urban Renaissance? An international comparison of urban regeneration policies,  co-edited with Libby Porter of Monash University.

Public engagement
Dr. Shaw is notable for her work in connection with the protection of local cultural diversity and alternative sub-cultures. This has encompassed community activism and education, media contributions and academic publications.

Shaw was involved in the 'Save the Espy' campaign in the late 1990s and early 2000s, formally known as The Esplanade Alliance. The Esplanade Hotel in the inner Melbourne suburb of St Kilda is an iconic venue famous for its support of a wide variety of Australian rock and alternative music acts. The site on which the hotel stands was purchased in 1997 by developer Becton who proposed to build a high-rise upmarket apartment complex to take advantage of the extremely good views across Port Phillip Bay and back to the Melbourne central city area. Apart from the debate about the merits of such a tall building in an otherwise relatively low-rise area, the concern of local residents and the music community was that even if the hotel itself was allowed to remain, the venue would soon be forced to stop hosting live music due to complaints from the residents of the new apartment tower, as has been the case in many other gentrifying suburbs, such as Fitzroy. The campaign was successful in reducing the height of the tower significantly and ensuring that key aspects of the hotels layout were retained to enable its survival as a live music venue.

Selected publications 
 Porter, L. and Shaw, K. (Eds)(2008) Whose Urban Renaissance? An international comparison of urban regeneration strategies, London: Routledge
 Long, C., Shaw, K. and Merlo, C. (Eds)(2005) Suburban fantasies : Melbourne unmasked, Melbourne : Australian Scholarly Publishing
 Shaw, K (Ed)(1998) Planning practice 1998 : the best and worst examples of city planning and development, North Melbourne, Vic. : People's Committee for Melbourne

References
 Aesop Prize 2006
 Adam Morton, The Age, 5/5/07 - Foreign students living on edge of society
  If you value live music, please read!
  The Esplanade Alliance

Activists from Melbourne
1961 births
Living people
Academic staff of the University of Melbourne